The Wild and the Willing is a 1962 British romantic drama film, directed by Ralph Thomas and starring Virginia Maskell, Paul Rogers, and Samantha Eggar. It is the film debuts of Ian McShane, John Hurt, and Samantha Eggar. It depicts a group of students at university.

It was filmed on location in Lincoln, with Lincoln Castle doubling as the university.

Plot
A group of young men at university enjoy students' life – dancing, drinking, meeting girls. Harry (Ian McShane), a somewhat rebellious young man, is going out with Josie (Samantha Eggar). His roommate, Phil (John Hurt), is a quiet outsider. Harry feels very protective towards Phil for some reason. Phil loves Sarah (Katherine Woodville), but she has jilted him for a new boyfriend, who is in her opinion more suitable.

As the plot develops, Harry gets involved with Professor Chown's (Paul Rogers) unhappy wife, Virginia (Virginia Maskell). The professor acts very aloofly towards her but doesn't want a divorce because he is expecting to be knighted. Harry wants Virginia to come away with him but she is too worried about her future and turns him down. Because of frustration Harry decides to pull a 'Rag Week' (annual student frolics) stunt. His idea is to climb the campus tower at night and raise a flag atop of it. He needs help to pull this off but all the other young men opt out for various reasons. Phil offers to join Harry, as he feels that Harry has done a lot to get him involved in campus life, rather than just living on the fringes. At first, Harry, worried about the consequences as Phil is not a good climber, refuses to take Phil along with him, but eventually, against his better judgment, he is persuaded to do so.

Gilby (Jeremy Brett), a smart striver, is jealous of Harry, as he used to see Virginia until she rejected him. He notices the activities around the tower and reports Harry and Phil to the university authorities. The teachers are more annoyed than worried and call the fire brigade. The spectacle draws a crowd.  Although Phil is a bad climber and slips several times, the two young men manage to reach the top and hoist their flag. But on the way down Phil loses his footing and, although Harry tries desperately to hold on to him, Phil slips from his grasp and falls to his death.

Harry is expelled ('sent down') from the university. At a final visit to Professor Chown and his wife, the Professor admits that Harry's paper was brilliant and that due to his stunt, he has forfeited a scholarship and an academic career. Josie meets Harry at the bus station and realises that she doesn't mean much to him. Yet she asks him to take her along, but he refuses, as he doesn't want to go on hurting people. The film ends with Reggie (John Sekka), an African friend, singing a ballad about Harry and Josie.

Cast

Production
It was based on a play, "The Tinker".

It was the first feature film for Samantha Eggar, John Hurt and Ian McShane. Betty Box says Hurt was the first cast; they used him to audition other actors. McShane was only months from graduating from the Royal Academy of Dramatic Art when asked to audition. "It's very appealing, movie money, so I did it and that was that", said McShane later.

Release
Betty Box said the film "didn't break records or win awards but it did reasonably good business and put the youngsters on the first rung of the ladder to stardom."

Critical reception
In the Radio Times,  David McGillivray wrote, "an unsuccessful play, The Tinker – written when Angry Young Men were in vogue – is the source of this exposé of British student life. Once shocking, it has aged as badly as others of its ilk, but now has considerable curiosity value, not least because of early appearances by Ian McShane, Samantha Eggar, John Hurt and others. McShane shines as the scholarship boy who vents his wrath on privileged society".

BFI Screenonline referred to the film as "Ralph Thomas's tepid student drama"; but Sky Movies concluded the film "still manages to generate moments of high excitement – none more so than a climatic climb up the sheer side of a crumbling steeple – a few minutes that are guaranteed to have you on the edge of your chair."

The film was released in the United States in 1964 as Young and Willing. The New York Times called the film "sophomoric".

Ian McShane's performance has been described as "the archetypal angry young man."

References

External links

1962 films
1962 romantic drama films
Films directed by Ralph Thomas
1960s English-language films
Films shot at Pinewood Studios
Films shot in Lincolnshire
British romantic drama films
Films produced by Betty Box
1960s British films